The Minister for Industry and Small Business was a minister in the New South Wales Government that was responsible for the promotion and development of industry and matters relating to small business policy and regulation.

The portfolios of Industry and Decentralisation and Small Business had been held concurrently since 1984 in the sixth Wran ministry. It was abolished in 1987 during the Unsworth ministry with industry becoming the responsibility of the Minister for State Development and small business returning to be a separate portfolio.

List of ministers
The following individuals have served as Minister where their responsibilities included industry and small business:

See also 

List of New South Wales government agencies

References

Technology